A widebeam is a canal boat built in the style of a British narrowboat but with a beam of  or greater.

The nature of a widebeam
The CRT gives no precise definition of a "widebeam", merely distinguishing it from other types of canal craft such as: narrowboats, Thames sailing barges, Dutch barges, other barge types, grp cabin cruisers, and wooden boats. Nevertheless, the salient features of a modern widebeam are: 

A widebeam is built in the style of a cruising narrowboat, that is to say, a steel-hulled barge used mainly by leisure boaters.  Typically, this entails a bow well-deck with doors leading aft to the living accommodation. The long saloon typically has numerous side-windows, and while its coachroof may have fitments such as solar panels and skylights, the overall height (as with a narrowboat) must be low enough to negotiate canal bridges. Echoing narrowboats, a widebeam's stern may be a cruiser stern or a "semi-trad"; but these days it is rare to see a widebeam with a traditional stern. Unlike some traditional narrowboats, a modern widebeam will rarely have a walk-through engine room with an antique engine such as a Bolinder; its engine will normally be found beneath the stern deck.

Whereas (except at the bow and stern) a narrowboat will normally have a rectangular cross-section below the gunwales, (although "Springer" narrowboats with V-shaped bilge sections are well-known), many widebeams may have a chined cross-section. A chined hull may steer more predictably than a flat-bottomed barge, because it holds a course more readily; and the chine allows the widebeam to approach closer to the canal bank where the canal is shallow or narrow.

History

It was soon realised  that it would be more efficient to have wider canals with wider  locks, and widebeam boats were introduced to take advantage of this change. Of course, the wider locks also meant that two narrowboats could enter a lock side-by-side, which was particularly useful if the second boat was a towed "butty".

(Occasionally narrowboats take to the sea, such as Terry Darlington's "Phyllis May", but both narrowboats and widebeams are Class D vessels fit for rivers, small lakes and canals. Inevitably, their greater beam makes widebeams more stable than narrowboats, but, with their bow welldeck vulnerable to flooding, they are still not true seagoing boats. 

There is a plan to make a north-south canal link around Bedford. This would allow widebeams to move from the north to the south, but this canal extension may take decades to accomplish.

Dimensions

Any widebeam with a permanent mooring and which is used a houseboat may be almost any size; but a widebeam intending to cruise the waterways must comply with size restrictions which dependant upon the dimensions of the waterway. A cruising widebeam's LOA is limited by the length of the shortest lock, its beam by the width of the narrowest lock (or some other width restrictions), and its draft by the canal's depth. (A canal is shallower at the sides than in the centre). Compared to narrowboats, this is a significant disadvantage for widebeams, particularly when meeting other boats.). A further restriction is that, if a cruising widebeam is to negotiate bridges and tunnels, its air draft must allow adequate clearance.

Dimensional restrictions on widebeams in and around London

The height restriction of a boat on the Lee (due to low bridges) means that a boat that can cruise on the Lee Navigation is low enough to cruise on Regents Canal.

If the boat were to turn north and travel to Rickmansworth, its maximum length must not exceed .

Notes

References
 
 
 

 

Boat types
Canals in the United Kingdom
Houseboats